Vinx De'Jon Parrette (born 15 December 1957), known professionally as Vinx, is a percussionist, singer, songwriter, and former athlete.

Vinx founded a critically acclaimed songwriting/creativity workshop series called Songwriter Soul Kitchen.

Discography

As leader
 Rooms in My Fatha's House (PANGAEA/I.R.S., 1991)

As sideman
 Sting, The Soul Cages (A&M, 1990)
 Cassandra Wilson, Blue Light 'til Dawn (Blue Note 1993)
 Stevie Wonder, Conversation Peace (Motown, 1995)
 Crystal Waters, Crystal Waters (Mercury, 1997)

See also
Jungle Funk

References

External links

Living people
1957 births
American percussionists